Dinčić is a Serbo-Croatian surname. It may refer to:

 Frano Menegello Dinčić (1900-1986), Yugoslav medalist and sculptor
 Milan Dinčić, Serbian singer from Zvezde Granda talent show
 Slobodan Dinčić (born 1982), Serbian footballer
 Virgil Meneghello Dinčić (1876–1944), Croatian painter and art teacher

See also
Dinkić

Serbian surnames
Croatian surnames